The 1912–13 British Home Championship was an international football tournament between the British Home Nations. An evenly matched tournament, all four sides won at least one game and the competition could have gone any way, as Ireland showed the following year when they won their first undisputed championship. In the event, the title went to England courtesy of a single goal victory over Scotland at Stamford Bridge in the final match. Scotland shared second place with Wales after both teams achieved three points and Ireland finished last with two.

Wales began the strongest team, beating Ireland 1–0 in Belfast. Ireland responded well to this defeat, winning against eventual champions England 2–1 in a tough game at Windsor Park. Wales and Scotland played out a scoreless draw in their match, leaving Wales on top of the table temporarily and Scotland flagging. The Scots recovered in their match against Ireland with a 2–1 victory away in Dublin (which featured a riot among supporters after the final whistle) before England recovered after a faltering start to win a gripping match against Wales 4–3 in Bristol. In the final game of the competition, England were trailing Scotland by a single point and knew that a loss could give the title to Scotland and Wales while a draw would leave all three teams sharing the championship. In another tough game, both sides played well but England snatched victory 1–0 and became champions for the third year in a row.

Table

Results

Winning squad

References

1913 in British sport
1913
1912–13 in Scottish football
1912–13 in English football
Brit
Brit